Eunoe bathydomus is a scale worm known from the north Atlantic Ocean at depths of 2000–3500 m.

Description
Number of segments 44; elytra 15 pairs (presumably). Anterior margin of prostomium with an acute anterior projection. Lateral antennae inserted ventrally (beneath prostomium and median antenna). Notochaetae thinner than neurochaetae. Bidentate neurochaetae absent.

Commensalism
E. bathydomus is commensal. Its host taxon is a sea cucumber: Deima validum (Echinodermata).

References

Phyllodocida
Animals described in 1917